Genshin may refer to:

People 
Genshin (源信; 942 – July 6, 1017), also known as Eshin Sozu, a Japanese Tendai scholar.
Musashi Genshin, also known as Miyamoto Musashi (宮本 武蔵, c. 1584 – June 13, 1645), also known as Shinmen Takezō, Miyamoto Bennosuke or, by his Buddhist name, Niten Dōraku,  a Japanese swordsman, philosopher, strategist, writer and rōnin.
Hiraga Genshin (平賀 源信, died 1536), a retainer to the Takeda family towards the beginning of Japan's Sengoku period (1467–1615).
Genshin Takano (governor of Hiroshima), (高野 源進 Takano Genshin, March 15, 1895 – January 4, 1969), a Japanese lawyer and Home Ministry and Police Bureau government official.

Video games 
Genshin Impact (原神), a fantasy video game
Genshin, leader of the Black Spider Ninja Clan, a character in the Ninja Gaiden II video game
Genshin Asogi, a character in the visual novel The Great Ace Attorney 2